Justin Ross Edwards (born January 26, 1983) is an American mixed martial artist currently competing in the Lightweight division. A professional MMA competitor since 2008, Edwards has also formerly competed for the UFC, Bellator, and was a competitor on The Ultimate Fighter: Team Lesnar vs. Team dos Santos and The Ultimate Fighter: Redemption.

Background
Edwards grew up in Mansfield, Ohio, attending Madison High School. There he participated in football and wrestling. Edwards also did Greco-Roman wrestling that was not affiliated with his school. Upon graduating Edwards earned an athletic scholarship to play football at Urbana University in Urbana, Ohio. Edwards graduated with a Bachelor of Science degree majoring in Criminal Justice. After graduating college Edwards picked up rugby until his work schedule wouldn't allow him to play.

Mixed martial arts career

Background
Edwards started training MMA in 2006 after seeing an MMA fight on television, and began training at a local gym the following day. In October 2006, Edwards made his amateur debut, winning via submission. He won his next five amateur fights, holding an undefeated 6–0 record before losing three straight fights and then deciding to go pro.

Early career
Edwards made his pro debut with a 30 second TKO win over Ultimate Fighter alumni, Josh Rafferty. His next bout took place at Bellator 5 against veteran John Troyer. Edwards won the fight via submission towards the end of round one. He then entered a one night tournament for the International Fighting Championship, winning the tournament with wins over Davarius Scaife and Daniel Stittgen – both via first round submission. Edwards won two more fights before appearing on The Ultimate Fighter.

The Ultimate Fighter
In 2011, Edwards had signed with the UFC to compete in The Ultimate Fighter: Team Lesnar vs. Team dos Santos.

Edwards was flown in as a replacement fighter for Keon Caldwell, making Edwards a member of Team dos Santos. He had his first fight against eventual winner Tony Ferguson. Edwards lost after Ferguson threw an upkick that knocked him unconscious. He was set to appear in the wildcard round but was suspended 90 days and could not compete.

Ultimate Fighting Championship
After losing in the preliminary round, Edwards remained signed after the show. He made his official UFC debut June 4, 2011, on The Ultimate Fighter 13 Finale card, fighting against castmate, Clay Harvison. He lost the fight via split decision.

Edwards faced highly-touted prospect and Wand Fight Team product, Jorge Lopez, on September 17, 2011, at UFC Fight Night 25. He won the fight via unanimous decision.

Edwards stepped in to fight newly-signed Englishman, John Maguire, at UFC 138 in Birmingham, England, following the withdrawal of James Head due to injury. After being taken down and controlled for most of the fight, Edwards lost via unanimous decision (30–27, 30–27, 30–27).

Edwards was expected to face Mike Stumpf on February 4, 2012, at UFC 143. However, Stumpf suffered an undisclosed injury and was replaced by Stephen Thompson. Edwards was also forced to pull out of the bout and was replaced by Dan Stittgen.

Edwards faced Josh Neer on October 5, 2012, at UFC on FX 5. Edwards leaped into an arm in guillotine and finished the fight 45 seconds into the first round via technical submission after choking Neer unconscious. The finish won him Submission of the Night honors.

Edwards was expected to face Gunnar Nelson on February 16, 2013, at UFC on Fuel TV: Barao vs. McDonald. However, Edwards was forced to pull out of the bout citing an injury, and was replaced by returning veteran Jorge Santiago.

Edwards faced promotional newcomer Brandon Thatch on August 28, 2013, at UFC Fight Night 27. He lost the bout via first round TKO.

Edwards faced Ramsey Nijem in a Lightweight bout on January 15, 2014, at UFC Fight Night 35. He lost the fight via unanimous decision.

Edwards was expected to face Yancy Medeiros on August 30, 2014, at UFC 177.  However, Edwards pulled out of the event in the days leading up to the event citing an injury. Medeiros ended up fighting promotional newcomer Damon Jackson.

Edwards faced Joe Proctor on June 6, 2015, at UFC Fight Night 68. He lost the back-and-forth fight via submission with just seconds remaining in the final round.  Subsequently, he was released from the promotion.

The Ultimate Fighter: Redemption
In February 2017, it was revealed that Edwards would again compete on the UFC's reality show in the 25th season on The Ultimate Fighter: Redemption. Edwards was the seventh pick overall for Team Garbrandt. He defeated Joe Stevenson in the opening round by unanimous decision. In the quarter finals Edwards lost to Tom Gallicchio by submission in the first round.

Championships and accomplishments
International Fighting Championships
IFC Grandprix Winner (2009)
Ultimate Fighting Championship
Submission of the Night (One time) vs. Josh Neer

Mixed martial arts record

|-
|Loss
|align=center|10–7
| Willis Black
| TKO (punches)
| WXC 79: Warrior Wednesday 4
| 
|align=center|1
|align=center|0:47
|Southgate, Michigan, United States
|
|-
|Win
|align=center|10–6
| Carlo Prater
| Submission (guillotine choke)
| Premier Fighting Championship 9
| 
|align=center|3
|align=center|1:44
|Covington, Kentucky, United States
|
|-
|Loss
|align=center|9–6
| Devonte Smith
| KO (punch)
| Alliance MMA at the Arnold Sports Festival
| 
|align=center| 1
|align=center| 1:30
|Columbus, Ohio, United States
|
|-
|Win
|align=center|9–5
| Cody Pahan
| Submission (guillotine choke)
| Fight Night at the Island: Saunders vs. Volkmann
| 
|align=center| 1
|align=center| 1:24
|Welch, Minnesota, United States
|
|-
|Loss
|align=center|8–5
|Joe Proctor
| Technical Submission (guillotine choke)
| UFC Fight Night: Boetsch vs. Henderson
| 
|align=center| 3
|align=center| 4:58
|New Orleans, Louisiana, United States
|
|-
|Loss
|align=center|8–4
|Ramsey Nijem
|Decision (unanimous)
|UFC Fight Night: Rockhold vs. Philippou
|
|align=center|3
|align=center|5:00
|Duluth, Georgia, United States
|
|-
|Loss
|align=center|8–3
|Brandon Thatch
|TKO (knees and punches)
|UFC Fight Night: Condit vs. Kampmann 2
| 
|align=center| 1
|align=center| 1:23
|Indianapolis, Indiana, United States
| 
|-
|Win
|align=center|8–2
|Josh Neer
|Technical Submission (guillotine choke)
|UFC on FX: Browne vs. Bigfoot
| 
|align=center| 1
|align=center| 0:45
|Minneapolis, Minnesota, United States
| 
|-
|Loss
|align=center|7–2
|John Maguire
|Decision (unanimous)
|UFC 138
| 
|align=center| 3
|align=center| 5:00
|Birmingham, England
|
|-
|Win
|align=center|7–1
|Jorge Lopez
|Decision (unanimous)
|UFC Fight Night: Shields vs. Ellenberger
|
|align=center|3
|align=center|5:00
|New Orleans, Louisiana, United States
|
|-
|Loss
|align=center|6–1
|Clay Harvison
|Decision (split)
|The Ultimate Fighter 13 Finale
|
|align=center|3
|align=center|5:00
|Las Vegas, Nevada, United States
|
|-
|Win
|align=center|6–0
|Marcus Ajian
|Submission (guillotine choke)  
|CNG Promotions: Queen City Meltdown
|
|align=center|1
|align=center|0:40
|Cincinnati, Ohio, United States
|
|-
|Win
|align=center|5–0
|Tony Parker
|Submission (guillotine choke)  
|Extreme IT Challenge
|
|align=center|1
|align=center|1:20
|Findlay, Ohio, United States
|
|-
|Win
|align=center|4–0
|Dan Stittgen
|Submission (guillotine choke) 
|IFC: Wiuff vs. Newcomb
|
|align=center|1
|align=center|0:37
|Green Bay, Wisconsin, United States
|
|-
|Win
|align=center|3–0
|Davarius Scaife
|Submission (armbar)
|IFC: Wiuff vs. Newcomb 
|
|align=center|1
|align=center|0:48
|Green Bay, Wisconsin, United States
|
|-
|Win
|align=center|2–0
|John Troyer
|Submission (guillotine choke) 
|Bellator 5
|
|align=center|1
|align=center|4:12
|Dayton, Ohio, United States
|
|-
|Win
|align=center|1–0
|Josh Rafferty	
|TKO (punches)
|Extreme Challenge 111
|
|align=center|1
|align=center|0:30
|Elizabeth, Indiana, United States
|

Mixed martial arts exhibition record

|-
|Loss
|align=center|1-2
|Tom Gallicchio
| Submission (rear-naked choke)
| The Ultimate Fighter: Redemption
|  (airdate)
|align=center| 1
|align=center| 
|Las Vegas, Nevada, United States
|
|-
|Win
|align=center|1-1
|Joe Stevenson
| Decision (unanimous)
| The Ultimate Fighter: Redemption
|  (airdate)
|align=center| 2
|align=center| 5:00
|Las Vegas, Nevada, United States
|
|-
|Loss
|align=center|0–1
|Tony Ferguson
|KO (upkick) 
|The Ultimate Fighter 13
| (airdate)
|align=center|1
| align=center|3:56
|Las Vegas, Nevada, United States
|

Amateur mixed martial arts record

|-
|Loss
|align=center| 6–2
|Mickey Hughes
|Submission (armbar)
|NAAFS: Columbus Night of Pain 4
|
|align=center| 1
|align=center| 2:22
|Columbus, Ohio, United States
|
|-
|Loss
|align=center| 6–1
|Konstandinos Angelas
|Decision (split)
|ICFA: Shamrock Showdown
|
|align=center| 3
|align=center| 3:00
|Columbus, Ohio, United States
|
|-
|Win
|align=center| 6–0
|Troy Miller
|Submission (rear-naked choke)
|CSB 2: Caged Super Brawl 2
|
|align=center| 1
|align=center| 2:25
|Celina, Ohio, United States
|
|-
|Win
|align=center| 5–0
|Jason Koehler
|TKO (punches)
|NOTW: Night of the Warrior
|
|align=center| 1
|align=center| 0:35
|Dayton, Ohio, United States
|
|-
|Win
|align=center| 4–0
|Sean Lewis
|TKO (punches)
|NOTW: Night of the Warrior
|
|align=center| 1
|align=center| 0:30
|Dayton, Ohio, United States
|
|-
|Win
|align=center| 3–0
|Joe Camacho
|Submission (armbar)
|Iron Tiger Challenge 3
|
|align=center| 1
|align=center| 1:32
|Bellefontaine, Ohio, United States
|
|-
|Win
|align=center| 2–0
|Chad Smith
|TKO (punches)
|MFC 6: Mega Fighting Championship 
|
|align=center| 1
|align=center| 0:23
|Bellefontaine, Ohio, United States
|
|-
|Win
|align=center| 1–0
|Dusty Jones
|Submission (rear-naked choke)
|MFC 4: Mega Fighting Championship
|
|align=center| 3
|align=center| 2:11
|London, Ohio, United States
|

See also
 List of current UFC fighters
 List of male mixed martial artists

References

External links
 
 

American male mixed martial artists
Mixed martial artists utilizing Greco-Roman wrestling
Mixed martial artists utilizing Brazilian jiu-jitsu
Living people
1983 births
American practitioners of Brazilian jiu-jitsu
People awarded a black belt in Brazilian jiu-jitsu
People from Bellefontaine, Ohio
Urbana University alumni
Ultimate Fighting Championship male fighters